The 2010 League of Ireland Premier Division was the 26th season of the League of Ireland Premier Division. The division was made up of 10 teams. Shamrock Rovers were champions while Bohemians finished as runners-up.

Teams

Overview
Airtricity were announced as the new main sponsor for the League of Ireland on 26 February. The prize fund for the season was set at €911,000. The 2010 Premier Division featured 10 clubs. The regular season began on 5 March and concluded on 29 October. Each team played every other team four times, totalling 36 matches. On the final day of the season, Shamrock Rovers won the title with a 2–2 draw away to Bray Wanderers. Second placed Bohemians finished level on points with Rovers but lost out on goal difference.

Final table

Results

Matches 1–18

Matches 19–36

Top goalscorers

Promotion/relegation play-off
The eighth and ninth placed teams from the Premier Division, Galway United and Bray Wanderers, played off after the regular season was completed. The winner would retain a place in the 2011 Premier Division. The loser would play off against the winner of the 2010 First Division play off. The winner of this match would also gain a place in the 2010 Premier Division.    
Premier Division

Galway United retain their place in the 2011 Premier Division
Premier Division v First Division

Bray Wanderers won 7 – 6 on penalties and retained their place in the Premier Division

See also

 2010 League of Ireland First Division
 2010 A Championship
 2010 League of Ireland Cup
 2010 Shamrock Rovers F.C. season
 2010 St Patrick's Athletic F.C. season
 List of 2009–10 League of Ireland transfers

References

 

2010 League of Ireland Premier Division
League of Ireland Premier Division seasons
1
1
Ireland
Ireland